Proskauer is a surname. Notable people with the surname include:

Adolph Proskauer (1838–1900), Prussian-born Confederate soldier
Bernhard Proskauer (1851–1915), German chemist and hygienist
Johannes Max Proskauer (1923–1970), German-born American botanist
Joseph M. Proskauer (1877–1971), American judge, lawyer, and philanthropist
Julien Proskauer (1893–1958), American magician

See also
Proskauer Rose, a law firm